Sally Little (born 12 October 1951) is a South African-born professional golfer. She became a member of the LPGA Tour in 1971 and won 15 LPGA Tour events, including two major championship, during her career. In 2016, she became the first female golfer from South Africa inducted into the South African Hall of Fame.

Personal life
Little was born in Cape Town. She became a United States citizen in August 1982.

Amateur career
She was the low individual at the 1970 World Amateur Team Championship and won the South African Match Play and Stroke Play titles that same year. As an amateur, she tied for fifth at the 1971 Lady Carling Open.

Professional career
Little joined the LPGA Tour in 1971 and was named LPGA Rookie of the Year. Her first professional win was at the 1976 Women's International. Little holed a shot from a greenside bunker on the 72nd hole to edge Jan Stephenson by one shot.

Little's best season was 1982, when she finished third on the money list. She has won 15 times on the tour, including two major championships, the 1988 du Maurier Classic and the 1980 LPGA Championship. She was awarded the 1989 Ben Hogan Award from the Golf Writers Association of America and was recognised during the LPGA's 50th Anniversary in 2000 as one of the LPGA's top-50 players and teachers.

Professional wins

LPGA Tour (15)

Note: Little won the Nabisco Dinah Shore Invitational (now known as the Kraft Nabisco Championship) before it became a major championship.

LPGA Tour playoff record (4–2)

Major championships

Wins (2)

Team appearances
Amateur
Espirito Santo Trophy (representing South Africa): 1970

Professional
Handa Cup (representing World team): 2007, 2009, 2010, 2011, 2012 (tie)

See also

List of golfers with most LPGA Tour wins

References

External links

South African female golfers
American female golfers
LPGA Tour golfers
Winners of LPGA major golf championships
Sportspeople from Cape Town
South African people of British descent
1951 births
Living people
21st-century American women